Jakob Pehr Anatole Dedekind Bolin (September 28, 1893 – January 25, 1983) was a Swedish champion middle-distance runner. He held the world record for the 1000 meter from 1918 to 1922.

Biography
He was born on September 28, 1893, in Svalöv in Sweden. He participated in the 1920 Summer Olympics in Antwerp, Belgium. He died on January 25, 1983.

References

1893 births
1983 deaths
People from Svalöv Municipality
Swedish male middle-distance runners
Olympic athletes of Sweden
Athletes (track and field) at the 1920 Summer Olympics
Sportspeople from Skåne County